The 1990–91 A Group was the 43rd season of the A Football Group, the top Bulgarian professional league for association football clubs, since its establishment in 1948.

Overview
It was contested by 16 teams, and Etar Veliko Tarnovo won the championship.

League standings

Results

Champions
Etar Veliko Tarnovo

Balakov left the club during a season.

Top scorers

Source:1990–91 Top Goalscorers

References
Bulgaria - List of final tables (RSSSF)

First Professional Football League (Bulgaria) seasons
Bulgaria
1